"Sending Me Ur Loving" is a song by Australian indie pop band the Jungle Giants, released on 17 January 2020 as the second single from the band's fourth studio album Love Signs (2021).

Written and produced by the band's lead singer Sam Hales, the song debuted and peaked at number 55 on the ARIA Chart in February 2021, following Triple J's Hottest 100 of 2020 in January 2021, where it placed at number 8.

At the AIR Awards of 2021, the song was nominated for Independent Song of the Year and Best Independent Dance, Electronica or Club Single.

Background
Upon release, the Jungle Giants' frontman Sam Hales said, "'Sending Me Ur Loving' has been with me for so long, it's been such a pleasure watching it finally form into a complete track that represents the new production direction. The chorus had originally been Changed attached to a different song, and by some stroke of luck clicked right into this beat. It's an ode to a feeling of self confidence, and essentially a love ditty at the same time."

Reception
Al Newstead from Triple J called it "a new hip-twitching single" saying "it further pushes the band's occupation into a unique venn diagram where dance music and kooky indie pop overlap, with neat choppy guitars skirting an infectious beat built with some of that thong-slapping tubular bass in the mix."

Bruce Baker from The AU Review said "It's trademark Jungle Giants, with the jangly guitars, soaring vocals and a tune you want to shake your booty to."

Track listings
Digital download
 "Sending Me Ur Loving"  – 4:13

Digital download
 "Sending Me Ur Loving"  – 4:23

Digital download
 "Sending Me Ur Loving"  – 7:10

Charts

Certifications

References

2020 singles
2020 songs
The Jungle Giants songs